Richmond is a town in Washington County, Rhode Island. The population was 8,020 at the 2020 census. It contains the villages of Alton, Arcadia, Barberville, Carolina, Hillsdale, Kenyon, Shannock, Tug Hollow, Usquepaug, Wood River Junction, Woodville, and Wyoming. Students in Richmond are part of the Chariho Regional School District.

History
The town of Richmond was originally part of the territory of Westerly, Rhode Island (1669 to 1747), which remained in dispute for several years among the Colony of Rhode Island and Providence Plantations, Connecticut Colony, and Massachusetts Bay Colony. In 1665, King Charles II dissolved the charters of those three colonies and renamed the disputed area "King’s County".  In May 1669, the General Assembly of Rhode Island organized King's County into the town of Westerly, and the town of Westerly organized itself into four separate areas: Westerly, Charlestown, Richmond, and Hopkinton.

On April 19, 1873, there was a bridge washout in the village of Richmond Switch, which today is known as Wood River Junction. A passenger train approached, unaware of the bridge washout, and ran off the tracks and into the water. Eleven people died; others were swept downstream and were unaccounted for.

The Washington County Fair is the largest fair in the state and has been held in Richmond since 1970.

Charles II in 1665 did not dissolve the charters of Rhode Island, Connecticut or Massachusetts Bay Colony (though the last would have its charter revoked in 1684 and both Rhode Island and Connecticut would temporarily become nothing more than counties in the newly created Dominion of New England, 1686-1689).  The Royal Commissioners of 1664-1665 renamed what was known as the Narragansett Country the King's province and placed authority over this area with Rhode Island and which then created King's County for this area and that was renamed Washington County during the Revolutionary period.

Geography
It is a mostly forested, landlocked community

According to the United States Census Bureau, the town has a total area of 40.8 square miles (105.6 km2), of which 40.6 square miles (105.0 km2) is land and 0.2 square miles (0.6 km2) is water.

Richmond borders Charlestown to the south, Exeter to the north and northeast, Hopkinton to the west, and South Kingstown to the southeast. Richmond is the only town in Washington County that does not border another county or the ocean.

A  tract in Richmond is owned by the state and managed for wildlife food and habitat as the Carolina Management Area. The Carolina Management Area is primarily forest, but also includes wetlands and agricultural land.

Demographics

As of the census of 2000, there were 7,222 people, 2,537 households, and 2,034 families residing in the town. The racial makeup of the town was 96.97% White, 0.40% African American, 0.91% Native American, 0.44% Asian, 0.19% from other races, and 1.08% from two or more races. Hispanic or Latino of any race were 1.23% of the population.

There were 2,537 households, out of which 40.2% had children under the age of 18 living with them, 69.3% were married couples living together, 7.5% had a female householder with no husband present, and 19.8% were non-families. 14.3% of all households were made up of individuals, and 4.4% had someone living alone who was 65 years of age or older.  The average household size was 2.84 and the average family size was 3.14.

In the town, the population was spread out, with 27.9% under the age of 18, 6.1% from 18 to 24, 34.4% from 25 to 44, 24.5% from 45 to 64, and 7.0% who were 65 years of age or older.  The median age was 36 years. For every 100 females, there were 100.7 males.  For every 100 females age 18 and over, there were 97.9 males.

The median income for a household in the town was $59,840, and the median income for a family was $64,688. Males had a median income of $41,357 versus $29,115 for females. The per capita income for the town was $22,351.  About 1.9% of families and 3.0% of the population were below the poverty line, including 4.2% of those under age 18 and 4.3% of those age 65 or over.

Government

The town government is directed by a 5-member town council that is headed by a council president at the Richmond Town Hall. For the purpose of school administration, Richmond is a member town of the Chariho Regional School District  with the neighboring towns of Charlestown and Hopkinton. Richmond is represented in the Rhode Island State Senate by Elaine Morgan and in the Rhode Island House of Representatives by Justin Price. 

In May 2007 Richmond voters approved a referendum to create a Home Rule Charter Commission. The Charter Commission subsequently created a Richmond Home Rule Charter, and the Town Council unanimously approved its placement on the November 2008 ballot. Richmond voters approved the Charter by a 70%–30% margin. The Rhode Island General Assembly gave their approval on May 20, 2009, and the Charter took effect on May 28, 2009, when Governor Donald Carcieri allowed it to become law without his signature.

The Charter retains many features of the prior government: the 5-member town council headed by a council president; an elected town clerk; and a Finance Board and an annual Financial Town Meeting. The major changes included 4-year terms for the town councilors instead of 2 years, effective in November 2010, and the creation of a Town Administrator who reports directly to the town council.

Politics
Richmond leans Republican at the local level. In addition to being represented by Republicans in both chambers of the state legislature, it voted for Republican Allan Fung for governor in 2018. However, Richmond leans more Democratic in federal elections. It voted for Democratic Senators Sheldon Whitehouse and Jack Reed in 2018 and 2020, respectively. Richmond has voted for Democratic presidential nominees since 1988, with the exception of 2016, when Donald Trump won the town by 8%. Joe Biden flipped the town back for the Democratic Party in 2020 by three votes.

Notable people

 Billy Gilman (born 1988), country artist and runner-up of Season 11 of The Voice. Gilman is from the village of Hope Valley and is often mistaken as being from Hopkinton because most of the village is located in that town
 Thomas A. Tefft (1826–1859), architect
 Frank J. Williams (born 1940), Chief Justice of the Supreme Court of Rhode Island (2001–2009)

National Register of Historic Places listings in Richmond
Carolina Village Historic District
John Hoxsie House
Shannock Historic District
Wyoming Village Historic District

Adjacent Towns

References

External links

 
Towns in Washington County, Rhode Island
Towns in Rhode Island
Providence metropolitan area
1747 establishments in Rhode Island